Charles van den Bussche (18 October 1876 – 9 October 1958) was a Belgian sailor who competed in the 1920 Summer Olympics. He was a crew member of the Belgian boat Tan-Fe-Pah, which won the silver medal in the 6 metre class (1919 rating).

References

External links 
 
 

1876 births
1958 deaths
Belgian male sailors (sport)
Olympic sailors of Belgium
Olympic silver medalists for Belgium
Olympic medalists in sailing
Medalists at the 1920 Summer Olympics
Sailors at the 1920 Summer Olympics – 6 Metre